Coleophora querciella is a moth of the family Coleophoridae. It is found in North America, including Oklahoma, Pennsylvania and Canada.

The larvae feed on the leaves of Quercus, Tilia, Cornus, Prunus species.

References

querciella
Moths of North America
Moths described in 1861